Julia Reed (born March 21, 1987) is an American politician of the Democratic Party. She is a member of the Washington House of Representatives, representing the 36th district.

References

External links

1987 births
Living people
Democratic Party members of the Washington House of Representatives
Women state legislators in Washington (state)
21st-century American politicians
21st-century American women politicians
Smith College alumni
Princeton University alumni